Frank S. Hall (1890–1958) was an American politician. He served as the Democratic Speaker of the Tennessee House of Representatives from 1923 to 1925. In 1929, he sponsored the Hall income tax, which passed into law.

References

1890 births
1958 deaths
20th-century American politicians
Speakers of the Tennessee House of Representatives
Democratic Party members of the Tennessee House of Representatives